Zherlichikha is a rural locality (a village) in Ilyinskoye Rural Settlement, Kharovsky District, Vologda Oblast, Russia. The population was 19 as of 2002.

Geography 
Zherlichikha is located 17 km northeast of Kharovsk (the district's administrative centre) by road. Parshinskaya is the nearest rural locality.

References 

Rural localities in Kharovsky District